Japanese Paraguayans (Nikkei Paraguaijin) are Paraguayans of Japanese ethnicity.

History

Japanese immigration was not permitted by the Paraguayan government until the 20th century. The first Latin American country that Japanese people settled was Brazil. But when Brazil decided to halt Japanese immigration in the 1930s, a Japanese land company built an agricultural settlement southeast of Asunción. Two more colonies near Encarnación followed in the 1950s; many Japanese settlers came from neighboring Bolivia. During World War II, many Japanese Paraguayans were accused, alongside German Paraguayans and Italian Paraguayans. Until the end of World War II, many Japanese refugees arrived. The Japanese and Paraguayan governments made a bilateral agreement in 1959 to continue Japanese settlement in Paraguay. Although most ethnic minorities chose urban life, Japanese remained in agriculture- there were 8,000 Japanese settlers in rural colonies in the 1980s. The remaining Japanese settlers who are living in urban areas number 2,321. In spite of the long period of Japanese settlement in the country, there was a strong stigma against Japanese Paraguayan intermarriage, but a number of Japanese Paraguayans are Eurasians of Spanish and Japanese descent or of other European (mostly German or Italian) and Japanese descent.

Language

By the late 1960s to present, Japanese Paraguayans speak Japanese, Spanish and Guaraní. The earliest settlement supported a parallel educational system with subjects taught entirely in Japanese; the colonists eventually limited this to supplemental Japanese language classes.

Religion
First-generation Japanese Paraguayans were generally followers of Shinto and Buddhism. The first Japanese settlers at La Colmena brought a piece of stone from the Ise Shrine which was gazetted as a monument mark the settlement's founding. Japanese religious festivals were celebrated within the first few decades among the first and second-generation Japanese settlers and in the late 1960s, a majority identified themselves with the Buddhist and Shinto faiths. Conversion to Roman Catholic Christianity increased from the late 1970s onwards.

Education
In Asunción, there are the Japanese international school: Colegio Japonés en Asunción (アスンシオン日本人学校 Asunshion Nihonjin Gakkō), the Paraguayan-Japanese Center, which promotes Japanese culture in Paraguay and develops intercultural activities with the two countries and the Paraguayan-Japanese financial brokerage company, in Encarnación, the Japanese Association of Encarnación, Asociación Japonesa de Encarnación and in Ciudad del Este, the Japanese Association of the East Asociación Japonesa del Este and the Escuela Japonesa de Ciudad del Este Primary School.

Notable individuals
 Mitsuhide Tsuchida, footballer

See also
 Japan–Paraguay relations

References

Bibliography
 Masterson, Daniel M. and Sayaka Funada-Classen. (2004), The Japanese in Latin America: The Asian American Experience. Urbana, Illinois: University of Illinois Press. ;

External links
 Migration Historical Overview - Paraguay

Asian Paraguayan
 
Paraguay
Japanese Latin American
Ethnic groups in Paraguay
Immigration to Paraguay